Siegrid Pallhuber (born 1 May 1970) is an Italian biathlete. She competed at the 1992 Winter Olympics and the 2002 Winter Olympics.

References

1970 births
Living people
Biathletes at the 1992 Winter Olympics
Biathletes at the 2002 Winter Olympics
Italian female biathletes
Olympic biathletes of Italy
Place of birth missing (living people)
Sportspeople from Bruneck